Guthrie Hall born October 12, 1984 is a South African rugby union player. 
Until 2008, he played for Saracens in the Guinness Premiership.

Guthrie Hall's position of choice is as a number eight.

Life after Rugby

Guthrie is now enjoying a career as a freelancing Excel developer, and it is unknown as to whether he will be making a rugby comeback.

References

External links
Saracens profile

1984 births
Living people
Saracens F.C. players